Anthony James "Tony O" Esposito (April 23, 1943 – August 10, 2021) was a Canadian-American professional ice hockey goaltender, who played 16 seasons in the National Hockey League (NHL), 15 of those for the Chicago Black Hawks. He was one of the pioneers of the now popular butterfly style. Tony was the younger brother of Phil Esposito, a centre.  Both brothers had notable careers and are enshrined in the Hockey Hall of Fame. Esposito's jersey number 35 was retired by the Blackhawks in 1988.

Esposito won the NHL's Vezina Trophy, then awarded to the goaltender(s) of the team which allowed the fewest goals in the regular season, three times, most notably in 1970, when he recorded the modern (since 1942)  NHL record of 15 shutouts in a season. He was also awarded the Calder Trophy as the best rookie in the league that season. He was named to the league's First All-Star Team three times and to the Second All-Star Team two times, and served as one of Canada's two goaltenders in the 1972 Summit Series between Canada and the Soviet Union. In 2017 Esposito was named one of the '100 Greatest NHL Players' in history.

Hockey career

Early years
Esposito grew up in Sault Ste. Marie, Ontario with his brother, fellow future NHL star Phil Esposito. Phil described why Tony wound up playing goalie as a child: "Tony and I would play by ourselves or we'd get two other guys and practice shooting. One guy would be the goaltender and the others would shoot and the guy with the fewest goals would take over in goal. Tony won't like me saying this, but he always lost. I guess you could say that's how he wound up as a goalie." He played college ice hockey for Michigan Tech.

A three-year hockey varsity letter winner, Esposito was a three-time first-team All-America selection. He was a driving force in helping the Michigan Tech Huskies to the 1964–65 NCAA Championship and was named a first-team NCAA All-Tournament Team choice in 1965. Esposito was also a three-time All-WCHA first-team selection. In 2021, Esposito was named to the WCHA All-Decade Team for the 1960s.

Esposito turned professional with the Vancouver Canucks in the Western Hockey League in 1967–68 and played with the Houston Apollos in the Central Hockey League in 1968–69.

He first played in the NHL for the Montreal Canadiens during the 1968–69 season at age 25. He was only the third American college player selected by an NHL team. Esposito made his NHL debut against the Oakland Seals, playing 26 minutes in relief of Rogie Vachon. His first NHL start was against the Boston Bruins, then led by his brother Phil. The game ended in a 2–2 tie, in which Phil scored both goals for Boston and Tony made 33 saves. Esposito played thirteen regular-season games, due to both Gump Worsley and Vachon being injured. However, Esposito returned to the minor leagues when they both returned from their injuries. Worsley was injured again during the playoffs, so Esposito was called again. He served as backup to Vachon, dressing for all four games in the Finals as Montreal won the Stanley Cup, with Esposito having his name engraved on there as a winning member. As the Canadiens club was deep in goaltenders at that time, with Worsley, Vachon, and other prospects in the system, Esposito was left unprotected by the Canadiens in 1969.

Rise to fame
For the 1969–70 season, the Chicago Black Hawks claimed him from Montreal on waivers, known at the time as the "intra-league draft". Esposito had a spectacular season with Chicago, posting a 2.17 GAA and setting a modern-day NHL record with fifteen shutouts, for which he won the Calder Memorial Trophy as the league's best rookie. He also took the Vezina Trophy (then awarded to the goalies for the team which allowed the fewest goals during the regular seasons) and was named to the First All-Star team at season's end. He also was runner-up for league MVP (Hart Memorial Trophy). It was during this record-setting season that he earned the nickname "Tony O" for his shutout abilities, with the big letter O looking like the big zero that he kept holding opponents to. In 1970–71, he again proved to be one of the league's top goalies and helped Chicago finish first in the NHL's West division. The Black Hawks made it to the Stanley Cup Final, but lost in seven games to Montreal. The following season he posted the lowest GAA of his career (1.77) and shared the Vezina with backup Gary Smith. He was again selected to the NHL's First All-Star team.

Esposito was named to Team Canada for the Summit Series of September 1972. He was the first goalie to earn a win against the Soviets, splitting Canada's goaltending duties with Montreal's Ken Dryden. Esposito posted both the lowest GAA and the highest save percentage of the three goalies (Esposito, Ken Dryden, and Vladislav Tretiak) who appeared in the series. Tony's brother Phil had an exceptional series as well and was the inspirational leader of the team.

Despite the loss of Bobby Hull, Esposito and the Hawks led their division in 1972–73, but lost the Stanley Cup in six games to Montreal. Esposito was named to the NHL's Second All-Star team that year.  The next season, 1973–74, was another brilliant season with a sparkling 2.04 GAA and 10 shutouts. Esposito won his third Vezina, sharing it with the Philadelphia Flyers' Bernie Parent, and was again named a Second Team All-Star.

The Black Hawks declined over the next few seasons although Esposito remained among the top netminders in the NHL. In 1979–80, Esposito enjoyed a fine season with six shutouts and made the First All-Star team for the third time. In 1981, he became a naturalized American citizen and played for Team USA in the Canada Cup (he had previously represented Canada at the 1977 Ice Hockey World Championship tournament). He played a few more seasons in Chicago before retiring after the 1983–84 season.

Goaltending style
Esposito wrote:

"I don't like the stand-up style myself because I feel you get caught out of position too much. Instead of backing into the goal, you're moving out of the net as the shooters approach. When you move out and they make a pass across the net, I feel you give the pass receiver an open net to shoot at.

"I try to play the angles on the shooter. I believe in starting out beyond the crease area and then backing in as the shooter approaches–the way Hall or Roger Crozier do it. It's a new approach to goaltending.

"When I was younger, I was a stand-up goaltender. I feel I could still play that way, but I think I'm more effective playing my up-and-down style. I call this aggressive goaltending. You attack the puck.

"The other way you are playing the percentage. As I grow older, I may have to adjust to the stand-up style because with age you start to slow down physically. A guy nearing forty certainly couldn't play my style. Hall did and was very effective, but he is a very strong man."

Distinctions
Esposito is one of eight goalies to have won the Vezina catching the puck right-handed (that is, he was left-handed, using his dominant left hand for his stick and blocker). The other seven are fellow Black Hawks' legend Charlie Gardiner (in 1932 and 1934), the New York Rangers' Davey Kerr (1940), ambidextrous Montreal goalie Bill Durnan (1944–1947, 1949 and 1950), the New York Rangers' Gilles Villemure (1971), Tom Barrasso of the Buffalo Sabres (1984), Edmonton Oilers' Grant Fuhr (1988), and José Théodore of the Montreal Canadiens in 2002.

Esposito was the second NHL player to wear the number 35, after goaltender Fern Rivard wore 35 for the Minnesota North Stars in 1968-69, a common number now worn by many goaltenders. It was assigned to him during training camp prior to Chicago's 1969–70 season because the standard goalie numbers 1 and 30 were already assigned. After posting a shutout in his first exhibition game for the team, he chose to keep wearing the number. His number 35 was retired by the Blackhawks on November 20, 1988.

Esposito was noted as being superstitious, becoming upset by crossed hockey sticks, and regularly lining up his hockey sticks in a particular way.
Esposito also has the record for most Consecutive Stanley Cup playoff losses at 16

Esposito wore contact lenses throughout his career.

Retirement
He retired from professional play in 1984 and was named to the Hockey Hall of Fame in 1988. His number 35 was retired by the Blackhawks on November 20, 1988.

Esposito later became General Manager of the Pittsburgh Penguins. During his tenure, Esposito selected Mark Recchi at the 1988 NHL Entry Draft and traded for goaltender Tom Barrasso. In 1991, when his brother helped found the Tampa Bay Lightning, Phil hired Tony as chief scout. Both Espositos were fired in 1998 after the team was sold.

In 1998, he was ranked number 79 on [[List of 100 greatest hockey players by The Hockey News|The Hockey News''' list of the 100 Greatest Hockey Players]], 61 places behind his brother Phil, who ranked number 18.

In 2007, Tony was inducted, alongside his brother Phil, into the Sault Ste. Marie Walk of Fame.

On March 19, 2008, the Chicago Blackhawks honoured Esposito with "Tony Esposito Night", where he was formally introduced as an Ambassador for the Blackhawks organization. Then-Blackhawk goaltenders Patrick Lalime and Nikolai Khabibulin both wore Esposito's #35 on their jerseys in the pre-game warmups, and Khabibulin recorded a shutout in a Hawks 5–0 win over the Washington Capitals.

Personal life
Esposito and his wife Marilyn had two sons, Mark and Jason. Tony Esposito died on August 10, 2021, at the age of 78, from pancreatic cancer.

In popular culture
 Garth Algar (Dana Carvey) wears Esposito's jersey while playing road hockey in Wayne's World and Wayne's World 2.
 He made an appearance in the second season of Rent-a-Goalie'' playing poker alongside his brother Phil.

Awards and honours

Stanley Cup Champion (1969).
Calder Memorial Trophy (1970).
NHL First All-Star Team Goalie (1970, 1972, 1980).
NHL Second All-Star Team Goalie (1973, 1974).
Vezina Trophy (1970, 1972, 1974).
NHL All-Star Game Goalie (1970, 1971, 1972, 1973, 1974, 1980).
Member of Canada men's national ice hockey team at 1972 Summit Series and 1977 Ice Hockey World Championship tournament.
Played for US national men's hockey team in the 1981 Canada Cup.
His #35 was retired by the Chicago Blackhawks on November 20, 1988.
In 1998, he was ranked number 79 on ''The Hockey News''' list of the 100 Greatest Hockey Players.
Hockey Hall of Fame 1988

Career statistics

Regular season and playoffs

International

See also 
List of NHL goaltenders with 300 wins
 Notable families in the NHL

References

External links

 Tony Esposito biography at The Goaltender Home Page - advanced statistics and game logs
 Stubbs, Dave. "Esposito revisits stories behind mask: How Hall of Fame goaltender's unique protective gear, success took shape". NHL.com, July 21, 2017.

1943 births
2021 deaths
AHCA Division I men's ice hockey All-Americans
American men's ice hockey goaltenders
American people of Italian descent
Calder Trophy winners
Canadian emigrants to the United States
Canadian ice hockey goaltenders
Canadian people of Italian descent
Chicago Blackhawks players
Deaths from pancreatic cancer
Hockey Hall of Fame inductees
Houston Apollos players
Ice hockey people from Ontario
Sportspeople from Sault Ste. Marie, Ontario
Michigan Tech Huskies men's ice hockey players
Montreal Canadiens players
National Hockey League All-Stars
National Hockey League players with retired numbers
NCAA men's ice hockey national champions
Pittsburgh Penguins executives
Stanley Cup champions
Tampa Bay Lightning scouts
Vancouver Canucks (WHL) players
Vezina Trophy winners